Kutu may refer to:
The Kutu people of Tanzania
Kutu language, the native language of the Kutu people

Places
Kutu, Democratic Republic of the Congo, a town and territory
Kutu (island), a municipality in the Federated States of Micronesia

Broadcasting
KUTU (FM), a radio station in St. George, Utah, United States
KUTU-CD, a television station in Tulsa, Oklahoma, United States

See also
 "Kutu Ma Kutu", a 2017 song

Language and nationality disambiguation pages